Bolechowice may refer to the following places:
Bolechowice, Lesser Poland Voivodeship (south Poland)
Bolechowice, Masovian Voivodeship (east-central Poland)
Bolechowice, Świętokrzyskie Voivodeship (south-central Poland)